Ertso Lake is a karst lake in the Java Municipality, Shida Kartli region of Georgia. Located in Qvirila river basin, north-west side of the Ertso-Tsona depression, at 1710 m above sea level. Lake Ertso is the biggest known karst lake in Georgia. The area of surface is 0.31 km2, while the catchment area is 5.85 km2. Average depth is 2,1 m, maximal depth is 19 m. The shape of the shore line is complicated. Three permanent rivers inflows of the lake. Lake Ertso extends in a roughly longitudinal direction. Four sinkholes are filled with water. Gets its feed from snow, rainfall and underground waters. The lake surface water temperature is 23–25 °C. The water level is high during May and June and is low during August and September. The lake freezes for almost 5 months in winter. Lake Ertso is included in the "Red List of Georgia". The village of Ertso is located eastern side.

See also 
 List of lakes of Georgia

References 

Lakes of Georgia (country)